is a Japanese creator of several anime and manga series. His name is romanized in some sources as Hiroshi Sasakawa.

Career
Born in Aizuwakamatsu, Fukushima Prefecture, Japan, he is well known as one of creators of Time Bokan series (with Ippei Kuri, Mitsuki Nakamura and Yoshitaka Amano), he has directed several animation works in the fantasy and science fiction genre, many (though not all) of them with Tatsunoko Production.

List of works
 Space Ace (1965-1966)
 Speed Racer (1967-1968)
 Oraa Guzura Dado (1967-1968)
 Dokachin the Primitive Boy (1968-1969)
 The Genie Family (Hakushon Daimao) (1969-1970)
 The Funny Judo Champion (Inakappe Taishou; original manga by Noboru Kawasaki) (1970-1972)
 Hyppo and Thomas (1971-1972)
 Science Ninja Team Gatchaman (1972-1974)
 Demetan Croaker, The Boy Frog (1973)
 The Song of Tentomushi (Tentomushi no Uta; original manga by Noboru Kawasaki) (1974-1976)
 Tekkaman: The Space Knight (1975)
 Time Bokan (1975-1976)
 Paul's Miracle Strategy Plan (1976-1977)
 Yatterman (1977-1979)
 Ippatsu Kanta-kun (1977-1978)
 Zenderman (1979-1980)
 Rescueman (1980-1981)
 Space Battleship Yamato III (1980-1981)
 Maeterlinck's Blue Bird: Tyltyl and Mytyl's Adventurous Journey (1980, with Leiji Matsumoto)
 Yattodetaman (1981-1982)
 Beast King Go-Lion (Lion Force Voltron) (1981-1982, series by Toei Animation)
 Bremen 4: Angels in Hell (1981, with Osamu Tezuka)
 Gyakuten! Ippatsuman (1982-1983)
 Tokimeki Tonight (1982, original manga by Koi Ikeno; series by Group TAC)
 Itadakiman (1983)
 Starzan S (1984; script writer)
 Ox Tales (1987)
 Wowser (1988)
 Dokkan! Robotendon (1995-1996)
 Cinderella Monogatari (1996)
 Speed Racer X (1997)

See also
 Tatsunoko Production
 Bessatsu Shōnen Sunday
 List of Time Bokan series

References

External links
 

1936 births
Japanese animators
Japanese illustrators
Living people
Manga artists from Fukushima Prefecture
People from Aizuwakamatsu